Concordia Lutheran Church is an LCMS (Lutheran Church–Missouri Synod) church in Frohna, Missouri.

Name
The name Concordia is in reference to the confession of faith of the Evangelical Lutheran Church adopted in 1850, which is commonly known as the "Book of Concord," or in short as the "Concordia."

History
The community of Frohna was founded by 29 families from Altenburg, Missouri, in 1839. Concordia Lutheran Church was established by Pastor Ernst Gerhard Wilhelm Keyl in his home that same year. A log cabin church, was constructed in 1843-44. During the Civil War, the church in Frohna merged with Trinity Church in Altenburg. This church building originally had two aisles, but the church was remodeled in 1949 to contain only a single central aisle. The original pews, altar, and pulpit were kept. The church parishes officially separated again in 1877, and have been separate since then.

Gallery

External links
/ Official website

References

Lutheran Church–Missouri Synod churches
1839 establishments in Missouri